This article lists players who have captained the Kilkenny county hurling team in the Leinster Senior Hurling Championship and the All-Ireland Senior Hurling Championship. The captain is chosen from the club that has won the Kilkenny Senior Hurling Championship.

List of captains

Notes
Reid was appointed captain although he had not yet nailed down a starting place on the Kilkenny starting fifteen. If he did not line out his brother, Eoin Reid was to act as captain. If neither Reid lined out Henry Shefflin would be the stand-by captain.
Fennelly was appointed captain although he had not yet nailed down a place on the Kilkenny starting fifteen. Henry Shefflin was appointed vice-captain and deputised when Fennelly was not playing.

Hurlers
+Captains
Kilkenny